Seoul Arts College may refer to either of two schools with similar names in Seoul, Korea:
Seoul Institute of the Arts (SeoulArts), in Ansan (main site) and Seoul 
Institute of Creative Arts, founded in 2008
Seoul Arts College (SAC) (ko), in Gangnam District, Seoul